Deltics is the second studio album by British singer-songwriter Chris Rea. It was released in 1979 on Magnet Records. The album is named after the East Coast rail network's Deltic-class locomotives that were used in the 1960s and 1970s. The album is Rea's first album to chart on the UK Albums Chart, peaking at number fifty-four. The single "Diamonds" peaked at number forty-four on both the UK Singles Chart, and Billboard Hot 100, where it charted for eight weeks. The B-side of this single "Cleveland Calling" is not included on the CD reissue of the album. The album producer Gus Dudgeon had made several early albums with Elton John.

Track listing
All songs by Chris Rea.

 "Twisted Wheel" – 5:15
 "The Things Lovers Should Do" – 3:35
 "Dance! (Don't Think)" – 3:52
 "Raincoat and a Rose" – 4:09
 "Cenotaph/Letter from Amsterdam" – 5:49
 "Deltics" – 5:28
 "Diamonds" – 4:51
 "She Gave It Away" – 4:00
 "Don't Want Your Best Friend" – 3:44
 "No Qualifications" – 2:20
 "Seabird" – 2:52

Personnel 
 Chris Rea – lead and backing vocals, pianos, synthesizers, accordion, acoustic guitar, 12-string acoustic guitar, electric guitars, slide guitar
 Graham Watson – organ 
 Eddie Guy – acoustic guitar (2)
 Martin Jenner – acoustic guitar (8)
 Kevin Peek – acoustic guitar (11)
 Mick Hutchinson – bass
 Norman Nosebait – drums 
 Gus Dudgeon – percussion (1, 2, 3, 6)
 Morris Pert – percussion (4, 7, 8)
 Bruce Baxter – brass arrangements (1, 7), string arrangements (1, 3, 4, 7, 11)
 Steve Gregory – brass arrangements (6, 9, 10), saxophone solo (10)
 Vicki Brown – backing vocals (3)
 Liza Strike – backing vocals (3)
 Joy Yates – backing vocals (3)
 Stuart Epps – backing vocals (6)

Production 
 Gus Dudgeon – producer 
 Stuart Epps – engineer 
 Gordon Vicary – mastering 
 Media Visual Arts Ltd. – sleeve design 
 Jacques Lowe – photography 
 Jim Beach – management 
 John McCoy – management 
 Recorded at Moonlight Studio (London, UK).
 Mastered at Utopia Studios (London, UK).

Singles
 "Diamonds" b/w "Cleveland Calling"
 "Raincoat and a Rose" b/w "No Qualifications"

References

Chris Rea albums
1979 albums
Albums produced by Gus Dudgeon
Magnet Records albums
United Artists Records albums